ERCO–BRO Nationals Football Club also known as ERCO Football Club is a Filipino association football club based in Cebu. ERCO Bro Nationals played at the final phase of the 2014–15 PFF National Men's Club Championship, its first time to represent Cebu in the national tournament. The club is affiliated with Green Archers United.

References

Football clubs in the Philippines
Sports in Cebu